Echeveria nodulosa is a species of flowering plant in the Crassulaceae family. It is commonly called painted echeveria, and is native to Mexico (widely distributed and rather common in North Oaxaca and South Puebla).

They are relatively disease free.

Taxonomy 
Echeveria is named for Atanasio Echeverría y Godoy, a botanical illustrator who contributed to Flora Mexicana.

Nodulosa means 'with swellings', or 'bearing nodules', and is typically given in reference to the presence of root nodules.

References

RHS.org

Endemic flora of Mexico
nodulosa
Taxa named by John Gilbert Baker